The men's singles tournament of the 2018 BWF World Championships (World Badminton Championships) took place from 30 July to 5 August.

Seeds

The seeding list is based on the World Rankings from 12 July 2018.

  Viktor Axelsen (quarterfinals)
  Lee Chong Wei (withdrew)
  Shi Yuqi (final)
  Son Wan-ho (withdrew)
  Srikanth Kidambi (third round)
  Kento Momota (champion)
  Chou Tien-chen (quarterfinals)
  Chen Long (semifinals)

  Lin Dan (third round)
  Ng Ka Long (third round)
  Prannoy Kumar (second round)
  Anthony Sinisuka Ginting (second round)
  Jonatan Christie (first round)
  Kenta Nishimoto (third round)
  Tommy Sugiarto (second round)
  Anders Antonsen (third round)

Draw

Finals

Top half

Section 1

Section 2

Bottom half

Section 3

Section 4

References

External links
Draw

2018 BWF World Championships